Jubal (also Yuval, Yubal or Tubal;  – Yūḇāl) is a Biblical figure in  of the Hebrew Bible and Old Testament. Mentioned only once, he is sometimes regarded by Christians, particularly by medieval commentators, as the 'inventor of music'. A descendant of Cain, his father is Lamech and his brother is Jabal.

Biblical narrative
The account describes him as a descendant of Cain and the son of Lamech and Adah. He is also a brother of Jabal, and half-brother of Tubal-cain and Naamah. The translations of these vary depending on the edition:

Family tree

In Islamic sources 
According to an unnamed Jewish source mentioned in Muhammad Al-Tabari's work History of the Prophets and Kings (915 CE), Jubal invented musical instruments during the time of Mahalalel.

References

Sources

External links
 

Book of Genesis people